is a passenger railway station located in the city of Yokosuka, Kanagawa Prefecture, Japan, operated by the private railway company Keikyū.

Lines
Kitakurihama Station is served by the Keikyū Kurihama Line and is located1.7 rail kilometers from the junction at Horinouchi Station, and 54.0 km from the starting point of the Keikyū Main Line at Shinagawa Station in Tokyo.

Station layout
The station consists of two opposed side platforms connected to the station building by a footbridge.

Platforms

History
Kitakurihama Station opened on December 1, 1942 as a station on the Tokyu Shōnan Line. At that time, it was named , using the same kanji as the war-time Japanese name for Singapore in celebration of the Japanese victory. On February 1, 1948, the station was renamed , using the kanji for the Shōnan area of Japan. It became a station on the Keihin Electric Express Railway from June 1, 1948. The station was renamed to its present name on November 1, 1963.  A new station building was completed in December 1985.

Keikyū introduced station numbering to its stations on 21 October 2010; Kitakurihama Station was assigned station number KK66.

Passenger statistics
In fiscal 2019, the station was used by an average of 25,627 passengers daily. 

The passenger figures for previous years are as shown below.

Surrounding area
 Japan National Route 134
 Negishi Park (Traffic Park, Swimming Pool)
 Kitakurihama Shopping Street

See also
 List of railway stations in Japan

References

External links

 

Railway stations in Kanagawa Prefecture
Railway stations in Japan opened in 1942
Keikyū Kurihama Line
Railway stations in Yokosuka, Kanagawa